Marmoricola terrae is a bacterium from the genus Marmoricola which has been isolated from soil from Jeju Island, Korea.

References

External links 

Type strain of Marmoricola terrae at BacDive -  the Bacterial Diversity Metadatabase

Propionibacteriales
Bacteria described in 2015